The 1925–26 season was Manchester United's 30th season in the Football League. Newly promoted to the First Division, they achieved their best finish since before the Great War by finishing ninth in the league.

First Division

FA Cup

References

Manchester United F.C. seasons
Manchester United